Dobovo is a historic village in the municipality of Mavrovo and Rostuša, North Macedonia.

History
Due to uprisings in the Upper Reka region, Dobovo was burned down by Serbian and Bulgarian forces between 1912–1916.

Demographics
In statistics gathered by Vasil Kanchov in 1900, the village of Dobovo was inhabited by 24 Orthodox Albanians and 90 Muslim Albanians.

References

Sources

Villages in Mavrovo and Rostuša Municipality
Albanian communities in North Macedonia